Jorge Zvazola (born 20 December 1955) is a sailor from Chile, who represented his country at the 1984 Summer Olympics in Los Angeles, United States as crew member in the Soling. With helmsman Louis Herman and fellow crew member Manuel Gonzalez they took the 16th place.

References

Living people
1955 births
Sailors at the 1984 Summer Olympics – Soling
Olympic sailors of Chile
Chilean male sailors (sport)